If You Are the One may refer to:

 If You Are the One (film), a 2008 Chinese romantic comedy
 If You Are the One (game show), a Chinese dating show that first aired in 2010

See also
 If You Are the One 2, 2010 sequel to the 2008 film